Edwin Sheffield "Bulbs" Ehlers (March 10, 1923 – June 17, 2013) was an American professional basketball player. Standing  and weighing 198 pounds (90 kg), he played the forward and guard positions. Ehlers was drafted third overall in the inaugural 1947 BAA draft by the Boston Celtics. In two seasons in the league, both with the Celtics, Ehlers averaged 8.1 points per game.

Though born in Joliet, Illinois; Ehlers was raised South Bend, Indiana and attended South Bend Central High School. While there, he played basketball for future Hall of Fame player and coach John Wooden. Ehlers attended Purdue University, lettering for the Boilermakers in three sports; basketball, football, and baseball.

In addition to being the Celtics' first ever draft pick, the National Football League's Chicago Bears selected him in the 31st round (293rd overall) in the 1947 NFL Draft. The New York Yankees of Major League Baseball also signed him. He spent five seasons playing minor league baseball: three seasons with the Yankees and two with the Chicago Cubs. He spent the majority of his career at the AAA level, playing for such teams as the Kansas City Blues, Newark Bears and the Springfield Cubs.

Bulbs Ehlers was the father of NFL player Tom Ehlers; his granddaughters, Emily and Jessica, played intercollegiate volleyball at Purdue University and Campbell University respectively. His grandson, Scott Dreisbach, played football at the University of Michigan and spent several seasons in the NFL and the AFL.

He is unique in being a member of both the Indiana Basketball Hall of Fame and the Indiana Football Hall of Fame; he was inducted into the basketball hall in 1980, and the football hall in 1985.

BAA career statistics

Regular season

References

External links

1923 births
2013 deaths
Amateur Athletic Union men's basketball players
American men's basketball players
Baseball players from South Bend, Indiana
Basketball players from South Bend, Indiana
Binghamton Triplets players
Boston Celtics draft picks
Boston Celtics players
Forwards (basketball)
Greensboro Patriots players
Guards (basketball)
Kansas City Blues (baseball) players
Newark Bears (IL) players
Purdue Boilermakers baseball players
Purdue Boilermakers football players
Purdue Boilermakers men's basketball players
Quincy Gems players
Springfield Cubs players